Flagstaff Road is an arterial road in the southern suburbs of Adelaide in South Australia, Australia. It is one of the roads that carries commuter traffic between the city on the coastal plain and residential suburbs in the Adelaide Hills.

Route
The northern end branches off of South Road at Darlington at a traffic light intersection with Marion Road opposite. Most of the road is in the suburb of Flagstaff Hill. The southern end is a roundabout where Blacks Road crosses, and Happy Valley Drive continues from Flagstaff Road in the suburb of Happy Valley. There are no major intersections along its length, only residential streets and local collectors.

The part of Flagstaff Road above the escarpment is a divided road with two lanes in each direction. Prior to widening, the steepest section was three lanes, with the middle lane reversible to match peak traffic flow. At the bottom, there are two lanes feeding into it from the traffic lights, and a total of five lanes feeding traffic towards Marion Road and South Road (northbound).

History
The section with three lanes was upgraded to this standard in the 1980s, to address increasing traffic due to expanding suburbs such as Flagstaff Hill and Aberfoyle Park. The overhead lane direction indicators were upgraded from green arrows to white ones using newer technology in 2013. The 2019 South Australian state budget allocated  to widen the road and remove the reversible lane. Works started in early 2021, and were open to traffic in mid-2022.

Intersections
Flagstaff Road is entirely contained within the City of Onkaparinga local government area.

References

Freeways and highways in Adelaide